Hervé Madore (born 29 June 1953) is a former French slalom canoeist who competed from the mid-1970s to the mid-1980s. He won a silver medal in the C-1 team event at the 1981 ICF Canoe Slalom World Championships in Bala.

References

French male canoeists
Living people
Medalists at the ICF Canoe Slalom World Championships
1953 births